Jangarek or Jangark may refer to:
 Jangarek-e Bala
 Jangarek-e Pain